Friedrich Boedicker, (13 March 1866, in Kassel – 20 September 1944) was a Vizeadmiral (vice admiral) of the Kaiserliche Marine during the First World War.

Biography

Boedicker is perhaps best known for being present at the Battle of Jutland, where ships of his Second Scouting Group fired some of the first shots of the action. He also commanded the battlecruisers of the I Scouting Group during the bombardment of Yarmouth and Lowestoft a month before the battle of Jutland, due to Franz von Hipper being on sick leave.

Decorations and awards
 Iron Cross of 1914, 1st and 2nd class
 Order of the Red Eagle, 2nd class with oak leaves and swords
 Order of the Crown, 2nd class (Prussia)
 Service Award (Prussia)
 Honorary Knight's Cross, First Class of the House and Merit Order of Peter Frederick Louis (Oldenburg)
 Friedrich August Cross, 1st class (Oldenburg)
 Commander, First Class of the Albert Order with swords (Saxony)

Footnotes

References	

1866 births
1944 deaths
Military personnel from Kassel
Imperial German Navy admirals of World War I
Recipients of the Iron Cross (1914), 1st class
People from Hesse-Nassau
Vice admirals of the Imperial German Navy